Sheikh Yusof bin Ya'qub Sarvestani (died 1281 AD) was an astronomer, calligrapher and philosopher of Iranian Sunnis in the Ilkhanate period. The tomb of Sheikh Yusof Sarvestani is located in the city center of Sarvestan, adjacent to the field with the same name.

References 

Sarvestan
1281 deaths
13th-century Iranian philosophers
Islamic philosophers
Sufis
Iranian Muslim mystics